Rondeletia elegans is a species of plant in the family Rubiaceae. It is endemic to Jamaica.  It is threatened by habitat loss.

References

Flora of Jamaica
elegans
Vulnerable plants
Endemic flora of Jamaica
Taxonomy articles created by Polbot